Jakobstads BK, also known as JBK, is a Finnish Football team from Jakobstad currently playing in Kakkonen, a third tier soccer league in Finland. The club's home venue is Västra plan.

History
The club was founded at a meeting held on December 14, 1944.  Jakobstads Bollklubb's first official match was played on May 10, 1945 against NIK. The team's captain at that time, Lasse Hellund, scored the club's first goal. JBK later won the match 3–1.

The club's early history was significant as they played 16 seasons in the Suomisarja (Finland League), which at that time was the second tier of Finnish football, over three periods from 1948, 1950 and 1952–65.

More recently, JBK has mostly been represented in Kakkonen or in regional leagues (Kolmonen and lower). Since the early 1970s, the club has played in Kakkonen for 23 seasons in total (1973–75, 1977–78, 1996–97, 1999–2011, 2014–2015 and 2017).

References and sources
Official Website
Finnish Wikipedia
Suomen Cup
JBK Facebook

Footnotes

Football clubs in Finland
Jakobstad
1944 establishments in Finland